Damm may refer to:

Damm (surname)
Damm (Dummerstorf), a village in the municipality of Dummerstorf, district of Rostock, Mecklenburg-Vorpommern, Germany.
Damm, Parchim, a municipality in the district of Ludwigslust-Parchim, Mecklenburg-Vorpommern, Germany.
Damm, a district of the municipality of Schermbeck, in North Rhine-Westphalia, Germany
S.A. Damm, a Spanish brewery.
N. W. Damm & Søn, a Norwegian publishing house.
Damm or Altdamm, a former town at the lower Oder river now Dąbie (neighborhood of Szczecin) (Stettin)
Drivers Against MADD Mothers, an organization opposed to MADD.
Damm algorithm, a check digit algorithm presented by H. Michael Damm.
CF Damm, a Spanish football club.